Wathīma ibn Mūsā (died 9 December 851), nicknamed al-Washshāʾ ('trader in embroideries'), was a Persian Muslim historian and silk trader.

Born in the city of Fasā, Wathīma moved first to Baṣra, then to Egypt and to al-Andalus before returning to Egypt, where he settled in the city of Fusṭāṭ. He studied ḥadīth (traditions) and, according to Ibn al-Faraḍī, this was the purpose of his travels to the West. He wrote a Kitāb fī Akhbār al-ridda, an Arabic account of the great apostasy of 632. It is a lost work, although at least 110 passages from it are quoted by other authors, including Ibn Khallikān, Ibn Shākir al-Kutubī, Yāqūt al-Rūmī and Ibn Ḥajar al-ʿAsqalānī. It was praised for its literary quality and its breadth by Ibn al-ʿImād.

Wathīma died in Fusṭāṭ. He had a son, ʿUmāra ibn Wathīma, who was born in Fusṭāṭ. The Kitāb badʾ al-khalq wa-qiṣaṣ al-anbiyāʾ, a collection of legends of the prophets, is attributed to ʿUmāra, but is more probably the work of Wathīma.

Notes

References

Bibliography

851 deaths
People from Fasa
9th-century historians from the Abbasid Caliphate
9th-century Arabic writers